Oscar is an unincorporated community located in Ballard County, Kentucky, United States. The community was named after Oscar Turner.

References

Unincorporated communities in Ballard County, Kentucky
Unincorporated communities in Kentucky